Zinc finger protein 621 is a protein that in humans is encoded by the ZNF621 gene.

References

Further reading